The 1983 Hawaii Rainbow Warriors football team represented the University of Hawaiʻi at Mānoa in the Western Athletic Conference during the 1983 NCAA Division I-A football season. In their seventh season under head coach Dick Tomey, the Rainbow Warriors compiled a 5–5–1 record.

Schedule

References

Hawaii
Hawaii Rainbow Warriors football seasons
Hawaii Rainbow Warriors football